Sergeyevka is a rural locality (a settlement) in Novozhiznenskoye Rural Settlement, Anninsky District, Voronezh Oblast, Russia. The population was 55 as of 2010.

Geography 
Sergeyevka is located 46 km southeast of Anna (the district's administrative centre) by road. Nikolayevka is the nearest rural locality.

References 

Rural localities in Anninsky District